The 1977 National Soccer League match between Adelaide City and Mooroolbark at Olympic Sports Field, Adelaide, took place on Sunday, 4 September 1977. Adelaide won the match 10–3 for the highest-scoring match in the history of Australian top-flight soccer.

Background
Adelaide started the match in fourth with 37 points, with Mooroolbark in last place in relegation zone with 14 points.

Match

References

1977 in Australian soccer
September 1977 sports events in Australia
Record association football wins